María Eugenia Cordovez Pontón (November 11, 1934 – September 30, 2012) served as the former First Lady of Ecuador from 1984 to 1988. She was the ex-wife of the former President of Ecuador León Febres Cordero. As First Lady, Cordovez served as the chairwoman of Ecuador's National Institute for Children and Family (Innfa). She and former President Febres Cordero divorced in 1988 after thirty-four years of marriage. Both later remarried.

Cordovez died from cardiac arrest at her home Guayaquil, Ecuador, on September 30, 2012.  She was buried at Cemetery Parque de la Paz in Samborondón. She was survived by her four daughters from her marriage to President Febres Cordero -  María Eugenia, María Fernanda, María Liliana and María Auxiliadora.

References

2012 deaths
First ladies of Ecuador
People from Guayaquil
Place of birth missing
1934 births